Lindean is a village north of Selkirk and the Ettrick Water, in the Scottish Borders area of Scotland.

In 1590 the parishioners of Lindean had permission to rebuild their church on the north side of the Tweed, at the west end of Boleside, nearer to their houses, and a coble boat was to be provided to ferry the dead over the Tweed if required.

See also
List of places in the Scottish Borders
List of places in Scotland

External links

CANMORE/RCAHMS record of Lindean
Scottish Borders Council: Lindean Loch
Geograph image: Lindean Reservoir
Geograph image: Lindean Farm
Lindean Community Woodland

References

Villages in the Scottish Borders